Clathrina arnesenae is a species of calcareous sponge from the Atlantic Ocean. It is named after Norwegian spongiologist Emily Arnesen (1867–1928).

References

Clathrina
Fauna of the Atlantic Ocean
Fauna of Norway
Animals described in 2006